St. John's Evangelist Church is a church in Pińczów in Poland.

Churches in Poland
Pińczów County
Pińczów